Heichal Shlomo (Hekhal of Solomon: , Heikhal Shlomo; meaning 'Palace of Solomon') is the former seat of the Chief Rabbinate of Israel. It is located adjacent to the Great Synagogue on King George Street, Jerusalem, opposite the Leonardo Plaza Hotel. It is the Jerusalem Campus of Herzog College and houses the Jewish Heritage Center and Museum of Jewish Art.

History
The building was erected between 1953 and 1958, following plans by German-born architect Alexander Friedman. 

Since 1992, the building has housed the Jewish Heritage Center and Jewish Art Museum. 

The Renanim Synagogue was transferred from Padua together with its 18th-century Torah ark and bimah, and decorated with modern stained glass windows.  The Entrance Gallery displays temporary exhibitions of Israeli artists. The  museum displaying traditional and modern Jewish art in permanent and temporary exhibitions is named for British Jewish philanthropist Sir Isaac Wolfson.

In 2009, Pope Benedict XVI paid a courtesy visit to Heichal Shlomo, where he met with the two Chief Rabbis of Jerusalem.

References

External links

Buildings and structures in Jerusalem
Synagogues in Jerusalem
Museums in Jerusalem
Synagogues completed in 1958
1958 establishments in Israel